The Embassy of Greece in London is the diplomatic mission of Greece in the United Kingdom.

A Greek embassy in London was established shortly after Greek independence in 1828 and was formerly located at 51 Upper Brook Street in Mayfair. In 1975 the embassy moved to its current location, with the Mayfair building remaining as the Greek Ambassador's Residence.

In 1999 Kurdish protesters temporarily occupied the embassy in protest at the role of Greece in the capture of Kurdistan Workers' Party leader Abdullah Öcalan in Kenya.

Greece also maintains a National Tourism Organisation Office at 4 Conduit Street, Mayfair.

Gallery

References

External links
Official site

Greece
London
Greece–United Kingdom relations
Buildings and structures in the Royal Borough of Kensington and Chelsea
Holland Park